Assis Brasil is a  municipality located in the south of the Brazilian state of Acre.

The municipality contains part of the Rio Acre Ecological Station.
It also contains part of the  Chico Mendes Extractive Reserve, a sustainable use environmental unit created in 1990.

It is located near the Brazil–Peru Integration Bridge.

Name
The municipality was named after Joaquim Francisco de Assis Brasil, a diplomat who was involved in the transference of Acre from Bolivian to Brazilian control after the Acre War.

Towns and villages
Abismo
Assis Brasil - capital
Maloca
Reserva Extrema
São Francisco, Acre
Senegal, Acre
Seringal Paraguacu

References

Municipalities in Acre (state)